Government House is the official residence of the governor of Western Australia, situated in the central business district of Perth, the state capital. It was built between 1859 and 1864, in the Jacobean Revival style.

Government House is located on St Georges Terrace (Perth's main thoroughfare), sitting on the same block as Council House and the Supreme Court buildings. The site has been used by governors since the establishment of the Swan River Colony in 1829; the current building is the third to have served that purpose on the site. The buildings and gardens of Government House are of exceptional heritage significance, being listed on the Western Australian Register of Heritage Places and classified by the National Trust. They are regularly opened for public viewing.

Description 
The unique architectural character of the building is characterised by the use of stonework and bonded brickwork, incorporating square mullioned windows, decorated gables and ogival capped turrets. The attenuated gothic arcading at ground floor level derives from another form of Victorian Revival expression Fonthill Gothic. The building has 16 rooms on the ground floor and 25 on the first floor. According to the Western Australian Register of Heritage Places Assessment, Government House is a "unique example of a Victorian Gentleman's residence" set in landscaped gardens with mature plantings and a number of commemorative trees.

History 

Following the establishment of the Swan River Colony in 1829, the first governor Captain James Stirling and his family were initially housed in tents on a site near the corner of Barrack Street and St Georges Terrace, known today as Stirling Gardens and Supreme Court Gardens.  In 1832, a temporary wooden building was constructed on the same site and used until the so-called original Government House was built a short distance away near the present-day site between 1834 and 1835.  This building served successive governors until work began on the new, present-day Government House, for which the foundation stone was laid on 17 March 1859. The 1834/35, building was demolished in the 1880s.

The present Government House was built at a cost of £15,000 largely by convicts. Governor John Hampton took up residence in 1863, prior to its completion in 1864. In the 1890s, a ballroom was added, designed by or under the direction of government architect, Hillson Beasley, who designed a number of other public buildings in the city.

The Lodge 
A separate small house, known as The Lodge, was built  in the north-east corner of the gardens. It provided accommodation for the Governor's police orderly, whose duties required that he live close to the governor, and his family. The Lodge was designed by William Hardwick in Federation Queen Anne style. It was converted for use as offices in the 1980s.

See also 
 Government House
 Government Houses of Australia
 Government Houses of the British Empire and Commonwealth

Notes

External links 
 

Government of Western Australia
Official residences in Australia
Landmarks in Perth, Western Australia
Perth
State Register of Heritage Places in the City of Perth
Jacobean architecture
Victorian architecture in Western Australia
1864 establishments in Australia
Ballrooms in Australia